Alkes Long Price is an American statistical geneticist. He is Professor of Statistical Genetics in the Department of Epidemiology at the Harvard School of Public Health (HSPH), where he also holds a secondary appointment in the Department of Biostatistics. In addition, he is an associate member of the Broad Institute's Program in Medical and Population Genetics and a member of the HSPH Program in Quantitative Genomics. In 2017, he received the Outstanding Faculty Mentor of the Year Award from the Harvard School of Public Health.

Education
Price received a B.S. in mathematics from the University of Chicago in 1992, and a Ph.D. in mathematics from the University of Pennsylvania in 1997.

References

External links
Faculty page

Statistical geneticists
Living people
American geneticists
American statisticians
Harvard School of Public Health faculty
University of Pennsylvania alumni
Year of birth missing (living people)